Count László Listi de Köpcsény et Jánosháza (List, Listi, Listh, Listhy, Liszti, Liszty, Listius; 1628 – February 16, 1662) was a Hungarian poet.

Listi was executed for counterfeiting coins in 1662.

External links
Hungarian Biographical Lexicon 

1628 births
1662 deaths
Hungarian criminals
Hungarian male poets
Hungarian nobility
Executed Hungarian people
17th-century executions by Hungary
People from Sibiu
17th-century Hungarian poets
17th-century male writers
Counterfeiters